Thomasia glabripetala is a species of flowering plant in the family Malvaceae and is endemic to a restricted area of the south-west of Western Australia. It is an open shrub with densely hairy branchlets, sparsely hairy, wrinkled, elliptic or oblong leaves, and racemes of purplish-pink flowers arranged in leaf axils.

Description
The leaves are slightly wrinkled, both surfaces covered with star-shaped hairs, pale on the upper surface and rusty brown on the lower surface.

Taxonomy and naming
Thomasia glabripetala was first formally described in 1993 by Susan Paust in the journal Nuytsia, from specimens she collected near York in 1991. The specific epithet (glabripetala) means "smooth petals", referring to features that distinguish this species from T. montana.

Distribution and habitat
This thomasia grows in the open shrub layer of remnant woodland east of York in the Avon Wheatbelt bioregion of south-western Western Australia.

Conservation statusThomasia glabripetala'' is listed as "Threatened" by the Western Australian Government Department of Biodiversity, Conservation and Attractions, meaning that it is in danger of extinction.

References

Rosids of Western Australia
Plants described in 1993
glabripetala